The 1997 Dallas Cowboys season was the franchise's 38th season in the National Football League (NFL) and was the fourth and final season under head coach Barry Switzer. Heavily favored to represent the NFC in Super Bowl XXXII for the fourth time in the 1990s, the team took a significant step backwards. 

The Cowboys not only failed to improve on their 10–6 record from 1996, they finished with a losing record for the first time since 1990 and failed to qualify for the playoffs. A series of countless off-the-field incidents, lack of discipline, and rumors of infighting between quarterback Troy Aikman and head coach Barry Switzer plagued the team throughout the year.

Switzer resigned at the end of the season, bringing his coaching career to an end. Chan Gailey would be his successor.

Offseason

NFL draft

Roster

Regular season
Though the season began well with an impressive win against the Pittsburgh Steelers and a 3–1 start, the Cowboys would soon see a sharp decline that included five consecutive losses to close out the year.  A series of countless off-the-field incidents, lack of discipline, and rumors of infighting between quarterback Troy Aikman and head coach Barry Switzer plagued the team throughout the year. In a season filled with injuries and controversy, which also saw a tearful Michael Irvin promising change following a tough loss to the New York Giants in the final regular season game, Switzer would later resign after the season.  Notable additions to the team were linebacker Dexter Coakley.

Schedule

Game summaries

Week 1

    
    
    
    
    
    
    
    

Michael Irvin 7 Rec, 153 Yds

Standings

Awards and records
 Troy Aikman, Walter Payton Man of the Year Award

Publications
The Football Encyclopedia 
Total Football 
Cowboys Have Always Been My Heroes

References

External links
 
 Pro Football Hall of Fame
 Dallas Cowboys Official Site

Dallas Cowboys seasons
Dallas
Dallas